Bernard O'Reilly may refer to:

 Bernard O'Reilly (author) (1903–1975), Australian author and bushman
 Bernard O'Reilly (bishop of Hartford) (1803–1856), Roman Catholic bishop
 Bernard O'Reilly (bishop of Liverpool) (1824–1894), Roman Catholic bishop